At Vance is a neoclassical/power metal band formed in Germany. They were formed by vocalist Oliver Hartmann (ex-Centers) and guitarist Olaf Lenk (ex-Velvet Viper) in 1998.

Biography 
With the combined credentials of vocalist Oliver Hartmann and guitarist Olaf Lenk, At Vance easily obtained a deal with Shark Records. Rainald König (guitar), Uli Müller (keyboards), Jochen Schnur (bass), and Spoony (drums) rounded out the lineup that recorded 1999's debut No Escape. The album proved successful across Europe, and the group's second release, 2000's Heart of Steel (featuring new drummer Jurgen Lucas) was a surprise hit in Japan and encouraged At Vance to quickly issue a follow-up in 2001's Dragonchaser. The next year saw the band switching to AFM Records, losing their bassist and keyboard player, releasing their fourth album Only Human, and then hitting the road across Europe with Rhapsody and Angel Dust. A number of personnel changes ensued in 2003, as At Vance welcomed new vocalist Mats Levén and bassist Sascha Feldmann before recording their next LP The Evil in You. A tour with Kamelot followed the release.

Later, Lenk fired König and Feldmann, replacing the latter with bassist John ABC Smith (born Dario Trobok) (ex-Scanner, ex-Gallows Pole).  All guitar work was performed by Lenk, and drums by Mark Cross (ex-Helloween).  This formation released a new record, Chained, which transpired to be the last album with Mats Levén on lead vocals. In April 2007, At Vance's MySpace webpage announced a new record would be released in May 2007 entitled VII, introducing young singer Rick Altzi on vocals. The album was mastered at Finnvox by Mika Jussila.

Several of At Vance's albums contain transcriptions of classical pieces such as the first movement of Ludwig van Beethoven's Fifth Symphony and "Spring" and "Summer" from Antonio Vivaldi's "The Four Seasons." Their new lineup was announced on the band's webpage, adding Alex Landenburg (from Annihilator) on drums and Manuel Walther on bass.

In May 2009, the band announced via their MySpace page that Manuel Walther left At Vance and would be replaced by Wolfman Black of the German band Justice. In July 2009, AFM Records announced that the band's latest album, entitled Ride The Sky, would be released on 18 September. In April 2012, band released their ninth studio album, Facing Your Enemy via AFM Records.

Band members 
Current members
Rick Altzi – vocals
Olaf Lenk – guitars, keyboards
Chris Hill – bass
Kevin Kott – drums

Former members
Mats Levén – vocals, guitars
Oliver Hartmann – vocals, guitars
Rainald König – guitars
Uli Müller – keyboards
Jochen Schnur – bass
Sascha Feldmann – bass
Jürgen Lucas – drums
John ABC Smith (born Dario Trobok) – bass
Mark Cross (Spoony) – drums
Manuel Walther – bass
Wolfman Black – bass
Alex Landenburg – drums

Timeline

Discography 
Studio albums
No Escape (1999)
Heart of Steel (2000)
Dragonchaser (2001)
Only Human (2002)
The Evil in You (2003)
Chained (2005)
VII (2007)
Ride the Sky (2009)
Facing Your Enemy (2012)

Compilations
Early Works / Centers (2001)
The Best Of (2004)
Decade (2010)

References

External links 
At Vance official homepage

German power metal musical groups
Musical groups established in 1998
1998 establishments in Germany
Articles which contain graphical timelines